This is a list of members of the 2nd Parliament of Zimbabwe, which began in 1985 and expired in 1990. The Parliament of Zimbabwe is composed of the Senate and the House of Assembly. The 2nd Parliament's membership was set by the 1985 election, which gave ZANU–PF a nearly ⅔ majority, with PF–ZAPU taking most of the remaining seats. Of the 20 seats reserved for whites, 15 were held by the Conservative Alliance of Zimbabwe, with the moderate Independent Zimbabwe Group all but one of the remaining five seats.

Key

Senate

House of Assembly

Common roll 
Most of the elected MPs for ZAPU joined ZANU–PF in 1987 as a result of the Unity Accord, which merged the two parties.

White roll 
The following were the members elected on the white roll for the 20 seats in Parliament reserved for whites. In September 1987, having achieved the support of 75% of the House of Assembly as required under the Lancaster House Agreement, the constitution was amended to abolish the white roll constituencies. Twenty further members (including many of the former white MPs who were supportive of ZANU–PF) were co-opted onto the House of Assembly to replace them.

References 

 Zimbabwe Government Gazette, 12 July 1985

members of the 2nd Parliament of Zimbabwe